Haplogroup E may refer to:
 Haplogroup E (mtDNA), a human mitochondrial DNA (mtDNA) haplogroup
 Haplogroup E (Y-DNA), a human Y-chromosome (Y-DNA) haplogroup

See also
 Group E (disambiguation)
 E (disambiguation)